Guillermo Juan Bredeston (24 August 1933 – 28 July 2018) was an Argentine stage, television and film actor.

Selected filmography
 Pobres habrá siempre (1958)
 The Dragonfly Is Not an Insect (1963)
 Deliciously Amoral (1969)
 The Witches Mountain (1972)

References

Bibliography
 Andrew A. Aros. An actor guide to the talkies, 1965 through 1974. Scarecrow Press, 1977.

External links

1933 births
2018 deaths
Argentine male stage actors
Argentine male film actors
Argentine male television actors
People from Uruguay Department